Ahn Ji-young (born 14 September 1995) is a South Korean singer and songwriter. She is the main vocalist and only remaining member of South Korean indie band Bolbbalgan4.

In 2014, she was featured on the television programme Superstar K 6, and debuted as a member of Bolbbalgan4 along with Woo Ji-yoon in 2016. After Woo left the band in early 2020, it was announced that Ahn would continue to promote under the duo name.

Discography

Filmography

Television shows

Web series

Awards and nominations

References 

Living people
1995 births
People from Yeongju
South Korean women pop singers
Sungshin Women's University alumni